Pallavan is a 2003 Indian Tamil-language drama film written and directed by Padmamagan. The film stars Manoj Bharathiraja, Rathi and Munna, while Shara and Ilavarasu also appear in supporting roles. The film was released on 28 February 2003.

Cast
Manoj Bharathiraja as Pallavan
Rathi as Meena & Reena (dual role)
Munna as Manohar
Shara
Mukesh
Nassar
Ilavarasu
Abhishek Shankar
Mayilswamy
Vijayan
Nalini
Madhan Bob
Kumarimuthu as Nallakannu

Production
Directed by Padmamagan, making his first film, several new actors were cast alongside the lead duo of Manoj Bharathiraja and Rathi. Munna, a nephew of actress Jayabharathi, made his first acting appearance and was credited as Shankar, alongside Bangalore-based actress Shara and Mukesh. Manoj worked on the film alongside his commitments for another project titled MA Gold Model, which did not have a theatrical release. Padmamagan signed up for the film after having previously written dialogues in the Raghava Lawrence-starrer Style and associated with producer Rufus Parker. The title of the film Padmamagan, was inspired by the name by which Chennai's state-owned city buses were known earlier and Padmamagan hoped to evoke nostalgia amongst the audience. Several scenes and songs for the film were also shot on board in the city's buses.

Soundtrack
Soundtrack was composed by Vidyasagar, while lyrics written by Pazhani Bharathi.
"Mercury Poove" — Devan, Pop Shalini
"Oho nu Sollu" — Tippu, Timmy
"Saidudu Saidudu" — Karthik, Timmy
"Emmaithal" — S. P. Balasubrahmanyam
"Ma Venuma" — Anuradha Sriram

Release
The film had a low profile release on 28 February 2003. Film critic Balaji Balasubramaniam wrote "Pallavan has almost nothing going for it — it has a couple of uncharismatic heroes, an unrealistic college setting, a clichéd love triangle and an even more clichéd solution to it" and that "the director's treatment of these is not particularly inspired either", "so there is no surprise in the result — a boring, predictable outing that just serves as another nail in the coffin of Manoj's aspirations to become a bankable hero". A reviewer from Sify.com wrote "no one expects too much reality in films these days but here the plot is unrelentingly silly that you heave a sigh of relief when the film is over" and "you strive hard to find one redeeming factor in this film, which is technically slipshod with bad direction and jarring music".

References

2003 films
2000s Tamil-language films
2003 romantic drama films
Indian romantic drama films
Films set in Chennai
Films shot in Chennai
Films scored by Vidyasagar
2003 directorial debut films